The European Film Award for Best Visual Effects has been awarded annually by the European Film Academy since 2018.

Winners and nominees

2010s

2020s

References

External links 
 Nominees and winners at the European Film Academy website

Visual Effects
Awards established in 2018
2018 establishments in Europe
Film awards for Best Visual Effects